Basic Education High School (BEHS) No. 2 Latha (abbreviated to အ.ထ.က (၂) လသာ; formerly St. John's Convent School; commonly known as Latha 2 High School) is one of the most well known public high schools in Myanmar. Located in Latha Township opposite the Yangon General Hospital and next to the University of Medicine 1, Yangon, the all-girls school offers classes from Kindergarten to Tenth Standard (until Grade 10 in the new nomenclature).

The school's colonial era building is a landmark protected by the city.

Kyi Phyu Shin created many videos and movies including "Little stars of future" movie.

Uniform 
From Grade 1 to Grade 5, school-girls wear a white-shirt-and-green-skirt uniform. Starting from Grade 6, school-girls wear the traditional white Burmese blouse called yinbon eingyi, and green htamein.

List of Headmistresses 
 Muriel Tun Kyaw (1966–1980)
 Tin Tin (1981–1987)
 Nang Nuan (1987–1993)
 Win Kyi (1993–1996)
 Khin Ohn Myint (1996–2007)
 Dr. Theingi Kyaw (2007–2017)
 Dr. Nang Than Than Sein (2017–present)

Alumni 
 Mi Mi Khaing: Scholar and writer 
 Mohana Gill: Writer 
 Kyi Phyu Shin: Film director 
 May Thet Khine: Actress 
 Yadanar Mai: Actress, Singer 
 Pwint: Actress, Singer
 Win Maw Oo: Student activist shot dead by soldiers during the 1988 student protests
 Warso Moe Oo: Actress, Model, Singer
 Jenny (a) Han Nway Nyein: Singer, Model
M Seng Lu: Supermodel

References

External links 
 Little Stars of Future Full Movie (Part 1-10)
 BEHS 2 Latha
 BEHS 2 Latha in Burma
 Tomboys By kyelkywaichain

Girls' schools in Yangon
High schools in Yangon
Latha 2
1861 establishments in Burma
Buildings and structures in Yangon
1861 establishments in the British Empire